Marie Bouzková was the defending champion, having won the previous edition in 2019, however she chose to participate in Prague instead.

Mariam Bolkvadze won the title, defeating Valeria Savinykh in the final, 4–6, 6–3, 6–2.

Seeds

Draw

Finals

Top half

Bottom half

References

External Links
Main Draw

President's Cup - Singles
2021 Women's Singles